The 1906 Mesopotamia uprising was an uprising of Mesopotamian tribes in the Ottoman Empire, fought due to the refusal of the Ottoman government to allow for 10 day truce to investigate losses in the Yemeni Expedition of 1905. The uprising saw tribes holding up navigation across the Tigris River.

References 

Conflicts in 1906
Rebellions against the Ottoman Empire
1906 in the Ottoman Empire